The Gallery of 19th-Century Polish Art at Sukiennice, is a division of the National Museum, Kraków, Poland. The Gallery is housed on the upper floor of the Renaissance Sukiennice Cloth Hall in the center of the Main Market Square in Old Town Kraków.

The Gallery holds the largest permanent exhibit of the 19th-century Polish painting and sculpture, in four grand rooms. The majority of today's collection at Sukiennice comprises gifts from collectors, artists and their families.

History of the collection

The National Museum in Kraków was founded on October 7, 1879 by the decree of Kraków City Council following two-year-long renovations of the Sukiennice Cloth Hall under the direction of Mayor Mikołaj Zyblikiewicz. At a ceremonial ball of October 3, 1879 it was announced that artist Henryk Siemiradzki offered his monumental painting called the Nero's Torches (Pochodnie Nerona) as gift to the city, with the intention of creating a brand new national gallery in the building. The new Museum elected Władysław Łuszczkiewicz, Rector of the Academy of Fine Arts as its first director. It was a major cultural venue from the moment it opened. The collection grew rapidly under the foreign partitions, with spontaneous donations pouring in from local gentry, as well as artists themselves.

By the late 1930s, the collections consisted of almost 300,000 items, Siemiradzki won war, and all gold stop in abroad with German. Brudziński paint. The list of major benefactors grew exponentially bigger including many noble families. In 1920, the Museum acquired over 15,000 objects donated by a single collector, Feliks Manggha Jasieński, Dołęga coat-of arms. The construction of the Museum's contemporary New Main Building located at 3 Maja Street, started in 1934. All holdings ranging from antiquity to modern times were moved there.

The Gallery was closed to visitors from October 2006 till 2009 for major renovations; the bulk of the gallery's collections moved to Niepołomice Castle for temporary display. The Gallery re-opened in 2010 with new technical equipment, storerooms, service spaces as well as improved thematic layout of the display, providing a broader view of Polish art of the time.

Arrangement
The gallery's arrangement resembles that of a 19th-century salon. Each of the four large exhibition halls is defined by historical period and the theme usually revolving around the one central painting extending into an entire artistic epoch.

 Bacciarelli Room
The Enlightenment Room, also known as the Bacciarelli Room, features late Baroque, Rococo, and Classicist 18th-century portraits from the court of Stanisław August as well as historical paintings and battle scenes by Polish and foreign pre-Romantics; most notably, artwork by Marcello Bacciarelli, Josef Grassi, Giambattista Lampi, Per Krafft, Józef Pitschmann, Aleksander Orłowski, Franciszek Smuglewicz, Michał Stachowicz, Kazimierz Wojniakowski and similar others.

 Michałowski Room
The Piotr Michałowski Room called Romanticism or the age of insurrections includes the art of Artur Grottger and Michałowski's own battle scenes with his famed "Somosierra" as well as paintings of "The Cardinal", "Seńko" and portraits on horseback. Other artists include Henryk Rodakowski, Jan Nepomucen Głowacki – father of Polish school of landscape painting, Józef Simmler and Aleksander Józef Płonczyński among others.

 Siemiradzki Room
The Henryk Siemiradzki Room entitled Around the Academy prominently displays the monumental Nero’s Torches, a gift by an already world-renowned Siemiradzki to the Museum, painted around 1876. The exhibit revolves around the art of the late 19th century; mythological and biblical scenes, major historical events, independence themes, landscape, and still-life. Featured artists include Jan Matejko, Wojciech Gerson, Jacek Malczewski, Tadeusz Ajdukiewicz, as well as Władysław Łuszczkiewicz, Henryk Rodakowski and others. Following major 2007 conservation the historical panorama Prussian Homage by Matejko is also prominently featured.

 Chełmoński Room 
The Józef Chełmoński Room also called Realism, Polish Impressionism and Symbolism is devoted to new trends in Polish art of the late 19th century featuring landscape and genre painting, portraits, battle and domestic scenes by leading painters of the Young Poland movement, notably by Chełmoński himself with his Four-in-Hand (Czwórka, pictured), Maksymilian and Aleksander Gierymski, Józef Pankiewicz, and Leon Wyczółkowski (prominent impressionists); paintings by Wojciech Gerson, Julian Fałat, Adam Chmielowski, Stanisław Masłowski ("Moonrise")  and Józef Brandt, as well as large and controversial Ecstasy, or Frenzy of Exultations (1894, pictured) by Władysław Podkowiński, and many others. Symbolism is represented by the art of Jacek Malczewski.

 Sculpture
Sculptures include Pius Weloński's "Gladiator", Walery Gadomski's "Salome", Piotr Wójtowicz's "Perseus With the Head of Medusa", Teodor Rygier’s "Bacchante" – he is the author of Adam Mickiewicz Monument adorning the entrance to the Museum on the east side of Kraków Main Square; Antoni Pleszowski's "Sadness", Piotr Michałowski's "Napoleon on Horseback" and Stanisław Lewandowski's "A Slav Breaking Chains". Among the collection of portrait sculptures are, Piotr Michałowski's self-portraits, Antoni Kurzawa's "Mickiewicz Awaking the Genius of Poetry", Antoni Madeyski's "Portrait of Aleksander Gierymski", Wiktor Brodzki's "Instigations of Love", Piotr Wójtowicz's "After a Bath" and Antoni Madeyski's "Greyhound".

Theme rooms

See also
 Sukiennice (Kraków Cloth Hall)
 National Museum in Kraków
 Culture of Kraków

References

External links

Sukiennice Museum Home Page

Art museums and galleries in Poland
Poland
Registered museums in Poland
Museums in Kraków
Art museums established in 1879
1879 establishments in Austria-Hungary